Diego Alonso Urzúa Rojas (born 4 February 1997) is a Chilean professional footballer who plays as a midfielder for Curicó Unido.

Career

For the 2018 season, Urzúa was sent on loan to Chilean third division side Iberia.

Urzúa represented Chile at the 2018 Red Bull Street Style World Finals.

References

External links
 

Living people
1997 births
Chilean footballers
Association football midfielders
Curicó Unido footballers
Deportes Iberia footballers
Chilean Primera División players
Segunda División Profesional de Chile players
People from Curicó Province